Abel is a biblical first name which may derive from the Hebrew , itself derived from  (breath or vapour), or from the Assyrian for son. In reference to the biblical story, Abel is usually linked with his brother who killed him, as Cain and Abel.

Based on its occurrence in the Bible the name Abel has been used in many European languages; in Sweden it is attested since 1496, and in English it was mostly used by the Puritans in the 17th century.

People 
Note: Persons may be listed in more than one subsection.

Arts and entertainment 
 Abel Fernandez (1930–2016), American actor
Abel Ferrara (born 1951), American film director
 Abel Gance (1889–1981), French film director, producer, writer and actor
 Abel Pintos (born 1984), Argentinian singer-songwriter
 Abel Salazar (actor) (1917–1995), Mexican actor, director and producer
 Abel Salazar (scientist) (1889–1946), Portuguese physician and painter
 Abel Seyler (1730–1801), Swiss banker and theatre director and patron
 Abel Talamantez (born 1978), Mexican-American singer
 Abel Tesfaye (born 1990), Canadian musician better known as The Weeknd
 Abel Ferreira (1915-1980), Brazilian clarinetist and saxofonist

Nobility 
 Abel, King of Denmark (1218–1252)
 Abel, Lord of Langeland (1252–1279)

Politics 
Abel Goumba (1926–2009), Central African politician
 Abel Maldonado (born 1967), American politician
 Abel Millington (1787–1838), American politician
 Abel Muzorewa (1925–2010), Rhodesian/Zimbabwean politician and bishop
 Abel Pacheco (born 1933), former president of Costa Rica
Abel Santamaría (1927–1953), Cuban political activist
 Abel Tapia (born 1949), American senator of the Colorado General Assembly
 Abel Upshur, U.S. Secretary of State

Religion 
 Saint Abel (Syrian), a saint of the Syrian church
 Abel of Reims, saint, archbishop of Reims and abbot of Lobbes
 Abel of Tacla Haimonot, a monk and saint of the Coptic Orthodox Church
 Abel Muzorewa (1925–2010), Rhodesian/Zimbabwean bishop and politician

Sports 
 Abel Aguilar (born 1985), Colombian footballer
 Abel Antón (born 1962), Spanish long-distance runner
 Abel Balbo (born 1966), Argentine footballer
 Abel Braga (born 1952), Brazilian association football manager
Abel Buades (born 1977), Spanish footballer
Abel Camará (born 1990), Bissau-Guinean footballer
Abel Caputo (born 2000), Venezuelan footballer
Abel Casquete (born 1997), Ecuadorian footballer
 Abel Chimukoko (born 1972), Zimbabwean long-distance runner
Abel Conejo (born 1998), Spanish footballer
Abel De Los Santos (born 1992), Dominican baseball player
 Abel Ferreira (born 1978), Portuguese footballer
Abel Fuentes (born 1993), Mexican footballer
Abel Gebor (born 1990), Liberian footballer
Abel Gigli (born 1990), Italian footballer
Abel Hammond (born 1985), Ghanaian footballer
 Abel Hernández (born 1990), Uruguayan footballer
Abel Khaled (born 1992), French-Algerian footballer
 Abel Kirui (born 1982), Kenyan long-distance runner
 Abel Laudonio (1938–2014), Argentinian boxer
Abel Lizotte (1870–1926), American baseball player
Abel Lobatón (born 1977), Peruvian footballer
Abel Mabaso (born 1991), South African footballer
Abel Mamo (born 1994), Ethiopian footballer
Abel Masuero (born 1988), Argentine footballer
Abel Mendoza (born 2003), American footballer
Abel Miglietti (born 1946), Portuguese footballer
Abel Molinero (born 1989), Spanish footballer
Abel Moreno (born 1995), Spanish footballer
 Abel Gómez Moreno (born 1982), Spanish footballer
 Abel Mutai (born 1988), Kenyan long-distance runner
Abel Peralta (born 1989), Argentine footballer
Abel Redenut (born 1995), Papua New Guinean footballer
 Abel Resino (born 1960), Spanish association football manager and former goalkeeper
Abel Rodrigues (1922–2010), American basketball player
Abel Ruiz (born 2000), Spanish footballer
Abel Segovia (born 1979), Spanish footballer
Abel Silva (born 1969), Portuguese footballer and coach
Abel Stensrud (born 2002), Norwegian footballer
Abel Miguel Suárez (born 1991), Spanish footballer
Abel Tamata (born 1990), Dutch footballer
Abel Tasman (born 2014), American racehorse
Abel Thermeus (born 1983), Haitian footballer
 Abel Trujillo (born 1983), American mixed martial artist
Abel Valdez (born 1987), Argentine footballer
 Abel Xavier (born 1972), Portuguese former footballer
Abel Yalew (born 1996), Ethiopian footballer

Other 
 Abel Briones Ruiz (born 1973), Mexican businessman and suspected drug lord
 Abel Douay (1809–1870), French general
 Abel Lefranc (1863–1952), French literary historian
 Abel Makashvili (1860–1920), Georgian prince and soldier
 Abel Niépce de Saint-Victor (1805–1870), French photographic inventor
 Abel Pavet de Courteille (1821–1889), French linguist
 Abel Salazar (scientist) (1889–1946), Portuguese physician and painter
 Abel Stearns (1798–1871), trader and great landowner in California
 Abel Tasman (1603–1659), Dutch seafarer, explorer and merchant
 Abel Wolman (1892–1989), American inventor, scientist, professor and pioneer of modern sanitary engineering

Fictional characters 
 Abel Magwitch, a leading character in the novel Great Expectatations by Charles Dickens
 Abel Rosnovoski, lead character in the novel Kane and Abel, by Jeffrey Archer
 Abel, protagonist in W.H. Hudson's novel Green Mansions
 Abel Nightroad, in the anime Trinity Blood
 Abel (DC Comics), a host of horror comic anthologies
 Abel, Mabel's brother in the 1976–2000 comic strip Motley's Crew
 Abel Teller, the son of Jax Teller in the FX series Sons of Anarchy
 Abel, in the Battle Arena Toshinden video game series
 Abel, in the video game Street Fighter IV
 Abel, in the video game The Walking Dead: The Final Season
 Abel, a playable character in the video game series Fire Emblem
 Abel the Bard, the false identity assumed by Mance Rayder in the book series A Song of Ice and Fire, by George R. R. Martin.

See also 
 Abel-François Villemain (1790–1870), French writer, professor and politician
 Saint Abel (disambiguation)
 Abel (surname)
 Abelson, surname
 Abell (disambiguation)
 Abele (disambiguation)
 Abels (disambiguation)

References

Notes

Sources 
 А. В. Суперанская (A. V. Superanskaya). "Современный словарь личных имён: Сравнение. Происхождение. Написание" (Modern Dictionary of First Names: Comparison. Origins. Spelling). Айрис-пресс. Москва, 2005. 

French masculine given names
Spanish masculine given names
Hebrew masculine given names